Dakoda Kirk Martin (born August 21, 1995) is an American football offensive guard for the New Orleans Saints of the National Football League (NFL). He played college football for Texas A&M and Syracuse and was originally signed as an undrafted free agent by the Los Angeles Chargers.

Early life and education
Koda Martin was born on August 21, 1995, in El Paso, Texas. He attended high school in Manvel, being coached by his father Kirk. As a senior in high school, Martin earned second-team Class 5A all-state honors after making 72 tackles with nine sacks, seven forced fumbles and 12 tackles for losses at the defensive end position. After the year he accepted a scholarship offer from Texas A&M University, redshirting during his freshman year of 2014. He appeared in eight games in 2015, scoring a touchdown on defense against Ball State.

As a sophomore in 2016, Martin appeared in 13 games, making four starts. He started thrice at offensive tackle and once at tight end. He appeared in 13 games as well the following year, starting all but one at the left tackle position. He left the school in May 2018 as a transfer to Syracuse. He started all 13 games as a senior with Syracuse, leading the team in snaps and earning a spot on the 2018 All-ACC football team.

Professional career

Los Angeles Chargers
After going unselected in the 2019 NFL Draft, Martin was signed as an undrafted free agent by the Los Angeles Chargers on April 27. He was waived/injured on June 28 and placed on injured reserve three days later. He was released in August .

Arizona Cardinals
Martin was signed by the Arizona Cardinals on August 4, 2020. He was released at roster cuts and signed to the practice squad the next day. He was signed to a future contract on January 5, 2021. He was released again on August 31 and subsequently signed to the practice squad. He was promoted to the active roster prior to a week three game against the Jacksonville Jaguars. Martin made his NFL debut on September 26, appearing on four special teams snaps during the 31–19 win. On October 4, 2021, Martin was released by the Cardinals and re-signed to the practice squad. He signed a reserve/future contract with the Cardinals on January 19, 2022.

On August 29, 2022, Martin was waived by the Cardinals. He was re-signed to the practice squad on September 14, 2022. He was released off the practice squad six days later. He was re-signed to the practice squad on October 5, 2022. He was released on January 4, 2023.

New Orleans Saints
On January 11, 2023, Martin signed a reserve/future contract with the New Orleans Saints.

Personal life
His father Kirk played college football for the UTEP Miners and was an assistant coach while his son played for Syracuse. His mother Caren also was a sports player with UTEP. Koda Martin's father-in-law is current Syracuse head coach Dino Babers. Each of his three siblings also played college sports.

References

1995 births
Living people
Players of American football from El Paso, Texas
American football offensive guards
Texas A&M Aggies football players
Syracuse Orange football players
Los Angeles Chargers players
Arizona Cardinals players
New Orleans Saints players